Robert Mark Oliver  is a New Zealand chef, author and TV presenter specialising in the cuisines of the South Pacific.

TV Shows

Books 
 Me'a Kai: the Food and Flavors of the South Pacific, Random House; 
 Mea'ai Samoa: Recipe and Stories from the Heart of Polynesia, Random House;

Honours and awards 

In the 2022 New Year Honours, Oliver was appointed a Member of the New Zealand Order of Merit, for services to the food industry and Pacific communities.

References

External links 
 
 http://www.smh.com.au/good-weekend/robert-olivers-moveable-feasts-20150910-gjjpiu.html
 http://www.independent.co.uk/life-style/food-and-drink/new-zealand-chef-wins-cookbook-of-the-year-in-surprise-upset-2235249.html
 Huffington Post: http://www.huffingtonpost.com/robert-oliver

Living people
New Zealand chefs
Year of birth missing (living people)
Members of the New Zealand Order of Merit